Elson Viney-Bartel Brechtefeld (born 2 March 1994) is a Nauruan weightlifter who won a bronze medal in the 69 kg category at the 2013 Pacific Mini Games. He moved down to the 62 kg division in the following year, placing 13th at the 2014 Commonwealth Games, and later competed in the 56 kg category, qualifying for the 2016 Summer Olympics.

At the 2016 Summer Olympics in Rio de Janeiro, he finished in 15th place in the 56 kg category. He was the flagbearer for Nauru during the Parade of Nations.

References

External links
 

1994 births
Living people
Commonwealth Games competitors for Nauru
Weightlifters at the 2014 Commonwealth Games
Olympic weightlifters of Nauru
Weightlifters at the 2016 Summer Olympics
Nauruan male weightlifters
Weightlifters at the 2010 Summer Youth Olympics
Weightlifters at the 2018 Commonwealth Games